USA-205, also known as Space Tracking and Surveillance System-Advanced Technology Risk Reduction (STSS-ATRR), and previously as Block 2010 Spacecraft Risk Reduction is a satellite formerly operated by the United States Missile Defense Agency. It was launched to demonstrate new technology for missile detection early warning systems (MDEWS). The technology demonstrated on STSS-ATRR was used in the development of the Space Tracking and Surveillance System (STSS) part of the Space-Based Infrared System (SBIRS).

It was launched on a Delta II 7920-10C launch vehicle from Space Launch Complex 2W (SLC-2W) at the Vandenberg Air Force Base (VAFB) in California, at 20:24:25 UTC on 5 May 2009 into a Sun-synchronous orbit (SSO). The launch was conducted by United Launch Alliance.

Operational and administrative control of the Space Tracking and Surveillance System-Advanced Technology Risk Reduction (STSS-ATRR) satellite was transferred to Air Force Space Command (AFSPC), effective 31 January 2011. In addition to successfully demonstrating required on orbit system performance parameters for a prototype sensor technology, STSS-ATRR conducted Space Situational Awareness and related operations on an as-capable basis.

References 

Spacecraft launched in 2009
Spacecraft launched by Delta II rockets
USA satellites
Early warning satellites